The V-League 4th Season 2nd Conference is a tournament of the Shakey's V-League. The tournament began last October 14, 2007 at The Arena in San Juan. It ended last December 4, 2007 with the University of Santo Tomas Tigresses winning yet again against the first runner-up team from the 1st conference San Sebastian College - Recoletos Lady Stags in a dramatic 5-set game 3 finals match. These resulted in a back-to-back championship winning streak for the UST Tigresses as they are the defending champions from the 1st conference.

Tournament format
Single Round Robin Tournament
Top five teams will compete in the semi-finals
Top two teams with the best record after the single-round robin semi-finals will advance to the finals
If a team won 3 out of 4 games in the semifinals, they will have a chance for a playoff berth against the second seed team for the finals
Best of Three Championship series
If the battle for the gold ended in two games only, the battle for the bronze will be best of three also instead of one game.

Starting line-ups

Elimination round

Semi-finals round

Semi-finals standings

San Sebastian and Ateneo were the first two teams to reach the Semi-Finals by both defeating Lyceum of the Philippines University. University of Santo Tomas came next by winning against Adamson University, thus assuring themselves of a Semi-Finals berth. Adamson University clinched a playoff for the Semi-Finals slot by winning over Colegio de San Juan de Letran. De La Salle University-Manila also clinched a playoff for the last Semi-Finals slot against Far Eastern University. Colegio de San Juan de Letran got eliminated earlier by Adamson University as well as Lyceum of the Philippines University who bowed out of contention by losing to University of Santo Tomas. Far Eastern University also got eliminated at the latest stage of the eliminations by Ateneo de Manila University.

Finals berth playoffs
Ateneo de Manila University and University of Santo Tomas faced-off in a playoff match to determine who will get the last finals slot.

The first slot has already been taken by San Sebastian College - Recoletos; winning 10 out of 11 games and sweeping the semi-finals round.

University of Santo Tomas won 8 out of 11 games all in all but unsuccessful to win 3 out of 4 games in the semi-finals. Ateneo de Manila University, won 7 out of 11 games and had been given a chance for a playoffs against University of Santo Tomas because they won 3 semi-final games out of 4 games.

Adamson University and De La Salle University had been eliminated in the finals contention for failing to win three wins out of four games and with a lower standing than University of Santo Tomas, San Sebastian College - Recoletos and Ateneo de Manila University.

Among the eight teams this season, Lyceum of the Philippines University, Far Eastern University and Colegio de San Juan de Letran were the first ones to be eliminated.

Finals round
University of Santo Tomas defeated Ateneo de Manila University and denied them the chance to face the San Sebastian College - Recoletos for the Finals. The Finals featured the UAAP CHAMPION and the Season 4 1st Conference Shakey's V-league Champion University of Santo Tomas and the NCAA CHAMPION and the Season 4 1st Conference Shakey's V-league First Runner-up  San Sebastian College - Recoletos, the two most prestigious collegiate leagues in the Philippines. It had also meant that both schools faced each other again for the second consecutive time in the finals of the Shakey's V-league, in which all of it had happened within the 4th season; albeit separate conferences.

Conference awardees
Best in Sportsmanship:  Ma. Angeli Tabaquero
Most Energetic Player:  Maria Rosario Soriano
Most Improved Player:  Janet Serafica
Rookie of the Conference:  Ma. Carmina Denise Acevedo
Power Player of the Conference:  Laurence Ann Latigay
Hustle Player of the Conference:   Mary Jane Pepito
Player of the Conference:  Venus Bernal
Best Scorer:  Lithawat Kesinee
Best Attacker:  Jaroensri Bualee
Best Blocker:  Lithawat Kesinee
Best Server:  Jacqueline Alarca
Best Setter:  Charisse Vernon Ancheta
Best Receiver:  Mary Jane Pepito
Best Digger:  Lizlee Ann Gata
Finals MVP:  Venus Bernal
Conference MVP:  Lithawat Kesinee

Shakey's V-League conferences
2007 in Philippine sport
2007 in volleyball